Segheneytī qoraxat  (sometimes anglicized as Segheneity and known also as Saganeiti, Seganeiti, Seganeyti, Segeleyti, Segeneyti, Segeneytī, Segheneiti) is a small town in the Southern Region of Eritrea. Segeneyti is the third largest settlement in Akele Guzai, after Mendefera and Senafe.

References 

Populated places in Eritrea